Nebria calva is a species of beetle from Nebriinae subfamily that is endemic to the US state of  Arizona.

References

calva
Beetles described in 1984
Beetles of North America
Endemic fauna of Arizona